John G. Ziegler (August 21, 1909 – December 9, 1997) was an American control engineer who made significant contributions to the field of control theory. He is well known for his research paper on Ziegler-Nichols method, co-authored with Nathaniel B. Nichols.

References

Control theorists
1997 deaths
1909 births